(Adolf) Friedrich von Reinhard (19 January 1726, Altstreliz – 6 August 1783, Weimar) was a German jurist and publicist. He was a Pietist and supporter of Christian August Crusius.

Reinhard studied law in Toruń and theology at the University of Halle. In 1744 he founded Kritische Sammlungen zur neusten Geschichte der Gelehrsamkeit. He won first prize from the Prussian Academy of Sciences for La Système de Mr. Pope sur la perfection du monde comparé à celui de Mr. Leibniz (1755), a critique of the philosophy of Alexander Pope, Leibniz and Christian Wolff. He became professor of law at the university of Bützow in 1770.

References

1726 births
1783 deaths
German philosophers
Jurists from Mecklenburg-Western Pomerania
German civil servants
18th-century German civil servants
18th-century German writers
18th-century philosophers
18th-century German male writers